This is a list of Canadian films which were released in 1976:

See also
 1976 in Canada
 1976 in Canadian television

References

1976
1976 in Canadian cinema
Canada